Tekstilshchik (Russian: Текстильщик, also Textilshchik, Tekstilschik, Textilschik) means "the textile workers" or "the weavers".

As a sports team nickname, it may refer to:
 FC Tekstilshchik Kamyshin, a Russian football club from Kamyshin that played in the Top Division and the 1994-95 UEFA Cup
 FC Tekstilshchik Ivanovo, a Russian football club from Ivanovo
 Clubs formerly named Tekstilshchik:
 FC Spartak Kostroma, formerly Tekstilshchik Kostroma
 FC Volga Ulyanovsk, formerly Tekstilshchik Isheyevka
 FC Iskra Smolensk, formerly Tekstilshchik Smolensk
 CS Tiligul-Tiras Tiraspol, a defunct former top-flight club from Transnistria, Moldova, formerly Tekstilshchik Tiraspol
 Energetik FK, an Azeri club, formerly Textilshchik
Other uses:
 Tekstilshchiki District, a district of the South-Eastern Administrative Okrug of the city of Moscow